The Traunseebahn is a historic railway in Austria, running from Vorchdorf to Gmunden.

History

The railway was built in 1912; it connected Gmunden - then a successful spa resort - to the agricultural area around Vorchdorf. Early investment in electrification allowed the railway to remain viable where a steam railway would not.

Modern day
The terminus was moved from Traundorf to Seebahnhof in 1990. Today the historic railway carries a mix of commuter and tourist traffic. It is still operated by Stern und Hafferl Verkehr.

There were plans to extend the Traunseebahn so that it terminates closer to the centre of Gmunden, at Klosterplatz. From there it will be possible to extend the line further, to Gmunden's ÖBB station. The line was connected with Gmunden Tramway at 1 September 2018.

See also
 Gmunden Tramway
 Transport in Austria
 ÖBB

References

External links
 Timetable

Railway lines in Austria
Metre gauge railways in Austria
Railway lines opened in 1912
1912 establishments in Austria